Dylan Mertens (born 20 July 1995, in Amsterdam) is a Dutch professional footballer who plays as a winger for Botev Plovdiv in the Bulgarian First League.

Club career

Youth 
Mertens played for SDW, DWS and AFC before joining the FC Utrecht Youth Academy in 2008. Two years later he had to leave and decided to return to AFC. His return was not for long and after one season he moved to SV Argon. In the summer of 2013 he made the move to FC Den Bosch, where he played with the A1 (Under 19).

FC Volendam 
In the preparation of the 2014/15 season, Mertens joined FC Volendam on an amateur basis. That season, he played 15 matches in the second team in which he scored 4 times. He also made it to the match selection of the first team two times, but didn't make his debut. On 30 March 2015 he signed his first professional contract with FC Volendam, until mid 2017.

In the summer of 2015, Mertens joined the first team. On 7 August 2015 he made his debut for FC Volendam in the league match against NAC Breda (1-4 win). He replaced Rafik El Hamdi after 79 minutes. On 18 September 2015 he scored his first goal for FC Volendam, the opening goal in a 0-2 win against Helmond Sport. In February 2016, Mertens extended his contract at FC Volendam until mid 2018.

In the preparation of the 2016/17 season, Mertens tore off his front crossband and was unable to play for the rest of the season. On 29 April 2017, 10 months later, he made his comeback in a match of Jong FC Volendam against FC Rijnvogels.

TOP Oss
On 8 August 2019 it was announced, that Mertens had signed a contract until the summer 2020 with TOP Oss. However, after a disappointing start on the season, the club announced on 17 October 2019, that Mertens was one of three players that had left the club.

References

External links
 

1995 births
Living people
Dutch footballers
FC Volendam players
SC Telstar players
TOP Oss players
FC Tsarsko Selo Sofia players
Botev Plovdiv players
Eerste Divisie players
First Professional Football League (Bulgaria) players
Dutch expatriate footballers
Expatriate footballers in Bulgaria
Footballers from Amsterdam
Association football wingers